Debalina Majumder (born 1972, Calcutta, India) is an Indian filmmaker, writer, producer, and cinematographer. She studied Comparative Literature at Jadavpur University. Debalina has worked on feature-length documentary films, short films, travelogues, music videos, corporate films, telefilms and experimental films. She is passionate about environmental issues, gender, sexuality and occasionally writes for newspapers and magazines. She has also extensively worked as a cinematographer.

In 2005, her short film about mud football in Kolkata, (Sar..r..ra/ Joy Run) was selected to the <Shoot Goals! Shoot Movies!> short film competition, Berlinale Talent Campus, at Berlin, and also included in the Fifa 2006 World Cup Compilation.

Based on the story of two lovers who committed suicide, in the village of Nandigram (West Bengal, India), Debalina's film "... ebang bewarish" ("...and the Unclaimed"), questioned social taboos and familial non-acceptance in regards to same-sex relationship. " Based on the same event, Debalina's fiction film "Abar Jodi Ichha Koro" (If You Dare Desire) was released in 2017.

She has then followed up with "Tin Sottyi..."(In Fact...), a celebration and documentation of three non-normative lives. Gay India Matrimony and Citizen Nagar are in their post production phases.

Filmography

Awards
"... ebang bewarish" ("...and the unclaimed") received Jury Special Mention in the Documentary section of SiGNS 2014, organized by the Federation of Film Societies of India, Kerala on 1 June 2014.
Nearly 160 films under categories such as national competition for documentaries and short films; artists’ cinema were screened at the 8th edition of SiGNS, the pioneering festival in India for digital videos.

"Abar Jodi Ichha Koro" (If You Dare Desire...)  won the Diversity-award for best feature film at the 18th Barcelona International LGTIB Film Festival (2018), Barcelona, Spain and Best Film, Gender at the 6th Woodpecker International Film Festival, New Delhi, India, 2018

References

1972 births
Living people
Indian women filmmakers
Indian women film directors
Indian women cinematographers
Bengali film cinematographers
Indian women film producers
Film producers from Kolkata
Jadara University
Film directors from Kolkata
21st-century Indian film directors
Cinematographers from West Bengal
Women artists from West Bengal
Businesswomen from West Bengal
Indian film producers
Indian cinematographers